Animal-type melanoma is a cutaneous condition and is characterized by nodules and fascicles of epithelioid melanocytes with pleomorphic nuclei and striking hyperpigmentation, dendritic cells, numerous melanophages and, sometimes, an inflammatory infiltrate of lymphocytes.

See also 
 Balloon cell nevus
 List of cutaneous conditions

References 

Melanoma